Mojtaba Torshizi, also spelt  Mojtaba Tarshiz (born 26 March 1978) is a former Iranian footballer who played  in Iran's Premier Football League.

Professional career
Torshizi joined Tractor Sazi in 2009 after spending the previous two seasons at Esteghlal Ahvaz.

References

1978 births
Living people
Iranian footballers
Esteghlal Ahvaz players
Tractor S.C. players
Mes Sarcheshme players
Fajr Sepasi players
Sanat Mes Kerman F.C. players
Association football midfielders
People from Qaem Shahr
Sportspeople from Mazandaran province